Ignazio (Ignace) Cardini (December 1566 - 1602) was a Corsican medical doctor, naturalist and humanist of  Italian descent, born in Bastia, Corsica. He wrote a scientific work called “Istoriae Naturales Corsice Insulae”, in which he records the mineralogy and flora on Corsica. An outspoken critic of the Corsican clergy, most of the copies of his book were burned by local monks. He was eventually exiled to Lucca, Italy where he died.

Italian Renaissance humanists
16th-century Italian physicians
People from Bastia
1602 deaths
1566 births
People of the Republic of Genoa
Physicians from the Republic of Genoa